Frederick J. "Fred" Ramsdell (born 4 December 1960, in Elmhurst, Illinois) is an American immunologist.
Ramsdell graduated from the University of California, San Diego in 1983 with a bachelor's degree in biology and from the University of California, Los Angeles in 1987 with a Ph.D. in immunology. As a postdoc he worked at the National Institutes of Health and subsequently in biotech companies in the Seattle area.  He has served as a senior executive at several biotech companies Darwin Molecular/Celltech, ZymoGenetics, Novo Nordisk, and aTyr Pharma. Since the beginning of 2016, he has been Research Director at the Parker Institute for Cancer Immunotherapy in San Francisco.

Ramsdell and team identified Forkhead Box Protein P3 (FOXP3) in scurfy mice and in children with IPEX syndrome, a severe autoimmune disease. They further determined that FOXP3 plays a crucial role in the development of regulatory T cells.

In 2017, Ramsdell received, jointly with Shimon Sakaguchi and Alexander Rudensky, the Crafoord Prize for research in polyarthritis. He was cited for his "discovery of regulatory T cells that counteract damaging immune responses in arthritis and other autoimmune diseases."

References

External links
  Fred Ramsdell, Ph.D.  at the Parker Institute for Cancer Immunotherapy (parkerici.org)
 

American immunologists
University of California, San Diego alumni
University of California, Los Angeles alumni
1960 births
Living people